The 2005 French Open girls' singles tournament was an event during the 2005 French Open tennis tournament. Sesil Karatantcheva was the defending champion, but having elevated to the Women's Singles match this year.

Ágnes Szávay won in the final 6–2, 6–1, against Raluca Olaru.

Seeds 

  Jessica Kirkland (second round)
  Victoria Azarenka (second round)
  Chan Yung-jan (second round)
  Aleksandra Wozniak (first round)
  Timea Bacsinszky (quarterfinals)
  Ekaterina Makarova (third round)
  Monica Niculescu (second round)
  Ágnes Szávay (champion)
  Alexandra Dulgheru (second round)
  Alexa Glatch (third round)
  Aravane Rezaï (first round)
  Caroline Wozniacki (third round)
  Olga Govortsova (third round)
  Raluca Olaru (final)
  Mădălina Gojnea (third round)
  Vania King (third round)

Draw

Finals

Top half

Section 1

Section 2

Bottom half

Section 3

Section 4

Sources 
 Draw 

Girls' Singles
French Open, 2005 Girls' Singles